CDFA is the California Department of Food and Agriculture.

CDFA may also refer to:
 Community Development Finance Association
 CDFA, an entertainment distribution subsidiary of Shock Records
 CDFA, Faoileann Records catalogue numbers for Shaskeen

See also
Chief of the Defence Force (Australia)
CDFAS sports centre in  Val d'Oise, France
Archive of the Congregation for the Doctrine of the Faith (ACDF)
Council of Fashion Designers of America (CFDA)